Things I've Never Said is the debut studio album by British indie pop musician Frances. It was released on 17 March 2017 through Capitol Records.

Track listing

Notes
  signifies a co-producer
  signifies an additional producer

Charts

References

2017 debut albums